The Lincolnshire Wolds Railway Signals and Telecommunications Department is a railway department on the preserved heritage railway in Lincolnshire, England. It installs, maintains and repairs all the signalling and telecommunications on the LWR.

Ludborough

The original box was demolished by British Railways in early 1970s, after the line had closed to passengers. The new box was constructed by the LWR between 1994 and 1996, and is a close representation of the original. This box was standing until 1991 when it was destroyed by fire. Also inside Ludborough box is the original gate wheel from Hainton Street which opened the level crossing gates there. Ludborough box was passed by HMRI in October 2004 for use and was officially opened in April 2005.

Out of the 18 levers, at the present time, only 4 are in use. However a future scheme is currently being worked on that will bring 8 levers into use. All the signals with the exception of the Down Starter (LU3) have SPT's (Signal Post Telephones) fitted to them. These allow both the driver and signalman to contact each other. Ludborough currently operates two Great Northern Railway somersault signals (LU3 down starter and LU14 Up Inner Home). These type of signals were used all over the East Lincolnshire Railway, and is appropriate for the railway's needs.

Future plans will see the box operate 3 additional signals and a ground frame release operated from the box.

North Thoresby
North Thoresby signal box is a 7 lever Eastern region ground frame that has been installed to operate the track and signalling layout at North Thoresby. It operates two main line signals, two shunting signal for access to and from the siding, a facing point lock and a facing point for access in and out of the siding. With No.1 lever being released by the annetts key making up the final lever in the frame. North Thoresby signal box was commissioned on 7 August 2009.

The signalling type used here is a mixture of both ex-BR signalling and Ex LNER. All signals are of the Upper quadrant signal variety. This means that when the signals are cleared the move upwards to a 45 degree angle to show all clear. If the wire snaps the signal automatically fails safe and returns to danger.

A track circuit runs over the main line and siding to give an indication to the signalman as to the whereabouts of the train and also to prevent the points from being moved under a train.

Future
The future for the department is a good one. 
The Lincolnshire Wolds Railway is currently aiming towards Utterby halt (the next adjacent level crossing in the direction of Louth) and is also currently rebuilding the whole layout at the Louth end of the yard. 

This will include extending and altering the engine shed, laying new point work and extending the main line towards Utterby and updating the signalling accordingly. This will include 2 new signals and the ground frame. One of the new signals will be a 3 aspect colour light and the other will be a GNR somersault. When this work is complete the railway will then progress towards Utterby Halt and ultimately Louth.

See also
 Lincolnshire Wolds Railway

External links
 lincolnshirewoldsrailway.co.uk

Railway signalling in the United Kingdom
Rail transport in Lincolnshire